Sig Herzig (July 25, 1897 – March 12, 1985) was an American screenwriter and playwright.

Biography
Born Siegfried Maurice Herzig in New York City, Herzig began his career as the director of the comedy short Husband and Strife (1922), but he switched gears to create plot lines for more than three dozen silent films. His later screen credits included the screenplays for Artists and Models (1937), Marry the Girl (1937), On Your Toes (1939), Sunny (1941), I Dood It (1943), Brewster's Millions (1945), London Town (1946), and Three on a Spree (1961), another adaptation of Brewster's Millions.

Herzig's Broadway theatre credits included The Vanderbilt Revue (1930), Shoot the Works (1931), Ballyhoo of 1932 (1932), Vickie (1942), and Bloomer Girl (1944).

Herzig's television credits included Topper, Private Secretary, and Sugarfoot.

Herzig died in Thousand Oaks, California.

Partial filmography

Object: Alimony (1928)
The Lone Wolf's Daughter (1929)
Romance in the Rain (1934)
Lottery Lover (1935)
Broadway Gondolier (1935)
Old Man Rhythm (1935)
Millions in the Air (1935)
Colleen (1936)
Sing Me a Love Song (1936)
Ready, Willing, and Able (1937)
Artists and Models (1937)
Marry the Girl (1937)
Varsity Show (1937)
Gold Diggers in Paris (1938)
Four's a Crowd (1938)
Going Places (1938)
They Made Me a Criminal (1939)
Indianapolis Speedway (1939)
On Your Toes (1939)
I Wanted Wings (1941)
Sunny (1941)
My Favorite Spy (1942)
I Dood It (1943)
Meet the People (1944)
Brewster's Millions (1945)
Where Do We Go from Here? (1945)
London Town (1946)
Three on a Spree (1961)

External links

American male screenwriters
20th-century American dramatists and playwrights
Writers from New York City
1897 births
1985 deaths
American male dramatists and playwrights
20th-century American male writers
Screenwriters from New York (state)
20th-century American screenwriters